Vladimir Kolobov is an engineer with CFD Research Corporation in Huntsville, Alabama. He was named a Fellow of the Institute of Electrical and Electronics Engineers (IEEE) in 2016 for his contributions to the theory and simulation of, and software development for, industrial plasma.

References

Fellow Members of the IEEE
Living people
Year of birth missing (living people)
Place of birth missing (living people)
American electrical engineers